Eric Kim may refer to:
Eric Kim (comics), Canadian creator of comic books
Eric B. Kim, Korean-American businessman in the technology field

He specialises in many different types of Photography. His most know type of these are Beauty in the Mundane. This is when Kim takes an image that is not normally know to be beautiful and makes it appealing.